Petar Yuriy Denchev (born 16 March 1989 in Plovdiv) is a Bulgarian footballer, who plays as a goalkeeper.
 
At international level, Denchev was Bulgaria's second-choice goalkeeper, behind Ivan Karadzhov at the 2008 UEFA European Under-19 Football Championship.

Career
Denchev started his playing career at Lokomotiv Plovdiv's youth system, before moving to Spartak Plovdiv, where he made his first-team debut in the Bulgarian second division. Petar made his debut during the 2007–08 season on 3 November 2007 in a 0–1 away loss against Volov Shumen.

In June 2008, Denchev signed a three-year contract with newly promoted A PFG side Sliven 2000.

On 23 June 2010, Denchev joined Cherno More Varna as cover for Ilko Pirgov. He made his debut, coming on as a substitute for Marco Tiago after Pirgov's sending-off against Montana on 23 October, but was powerless to stop the rivals from scoring two times in a 4–0 loss at the Ogosta Stadium. Denchev took over as Cherno More's first-choice goalkeeper, when Pirgov was transferred to Litex Lovech in December 2011. He made 12 league appearances for the team during the second half of the A PFG season. In May 2012, Denchev sustained a serious injury, which kept him out of action for a number of months. He recovered in mid-September 2012 and in January 2013 signed a contract with Lokomotiv Plovdiv.

In the summer of 2014 he signed a contract with Navbahor Namangan and moved as a free agent to Uzbek League club to play the second half of the season.

On 28 December 2016, Denchev joined Lokomotiv Gorna Oryahovitsa but left the club at the end of the season following their relegation to the Second League.

Career statistics

References

External links
 

Living people
1989 births
Bulgarian footballers
Association football goalkeepers
FC Spartak Plovdiv players
OFC Sliven 2000 players
Bulgarian people of Russian descent
PFC Cherno More Varna players
PFC Lokomotiv Plovdiv players
Neftochimic Burgas players
PFC Spartak Varna players
FC Levski Karlovo players
FC Lokomotiv Gorna Oryahovitsa players
First Professional Football League (Bulgaria) players
Second Professional Football League (Bulgaria) players